Neha Narkhede is an Indian American technology entrepreneur and the co-founder and former CTO of Confluent, a streaming data technology company. She co-created the open source software platform Apache Kafka. Narkhede now serves as a board member of Confluent. In 2020, she was listed as one of America’s Self-Made Women by Forbes.

Education 
Narkhede was raised in Pune, Maharashtra and went to the Pune Institute of Computer Technology (PICT), University of Pune, where she gained a Bachelor of Science in engineering. In 2007, she received a masters in technology from Georgia Tech.

Career 
After obtaining her Master's degree, Narkhede started her first job at Oracle as a principal software engineer. After Oracle, she worked as the lead of streams infrastructure at LinkedIn.

While working at LinkedIn in 2011, Narkhede created the Platform Apache Kafka, along with Jun Rao and Jay Kreps. They came up with the idea while on a project at the company and developed Kafka as an open source Platform. In 2014 she founded Confluent, a Palo Alto based startup, along with Rao and Kreps and decided to start Confluent as a B2B infrastructure company.

In 2017 she co-authored Kafka: The Definitive Guide along with Gwen Shapira and Todd Palino which is about the technology that created Kafka.

She was the CTO of Confluent and later also took upon the role of Chief Product Officer until 2020. She now serves as a board member.

She and her team at Confluent raised  $125 million in 2019, bringing its total funding to $206 million in 2019. And in April 2020, the company raised $250 million bringing its total funding to $456 million.

Confluent as a company has filed for an IPO on June 1, 2021 and was valued at $4.5 billion. Companies such as Goldman Sachs, Netflix and Uber use the platform for data driven purposes.

Awards and honors 
In 2017, MIT Technology Review listed her as one of the innovators under 35. In the following year Narkhede was listed as one of America's and the world's top 50 Women in Tech by Forbes and she won the Oracle Groundbreaker Award at the Oracle Code One conference in San Francisco. In October 2020, Narkhede was listed #33 on the list of "America's Self Made Women" by Forbes. In 2022, Neha received the Abie Award for Technology Entrepreneurship Award Winner at the Grace Hopper Celebration of Women in Computing from Anitab.

References 

Living people
Year of birth missing (living people)
Businesspeople from Pune
American technology executives
American technology businesspeople
Indian emigrants to the United States